Al-Jawhari, also romanized as al-Jauhari, is the short form of a person's name and may refer to:

 Al-Abbās ibn Said al-Jawharī (died  860), Iraqi mathematician who wrote a commentary on Euclid's Elements
 Eliya ibn ʿUbaid, called al-Jawharī ( 879–903), Nestorian bishop and writer
 Ismail ibn Hammad al-Jawhari (died c. 1003), Turkic lexicographer who wrote one of the first large Arabic dictionaries
 Nur al-Din Ali ibn Da'ud al-Jawhari al-Sayrafi (1416- 1495), Egyptian historian and copyist